"Have You Heard" is a 1969 song by the progressive rock band the Moody Blues.  Written by the band's keyboardist Mike Pinder, "Have You Heard" is actually a two-part song, and both parts were recorded and released in 1969 on the Moody Blues Album On the Threshold of a Dream.

This song was used at the beginning and end of the winter finale episode of Marvel's Agents of S.H.I.E.L.D. on 21 February 2017.

Personnel

Have You Heard
 Mike Pinder – Mellotron, cello, vocals
 Justin Hayward – acoustic guitar
 John Lodge – bass guitar
 Graeme Edge – drums, EMS VCS 3
 Ray Thomas – flute

The Voyage
 Mike Pinder – Mellotron, Hammond organ, cello, piano
 Ray Thomas – oboe, flute
 Graeme Edge – percussion

References

1969 songs
The Moody Blues songs
Songs written by Mike Pinder